Scott Robert Fraser (born May 3, 1972) is a Canadian former professional ice hockey player who played in the NHL with the Montreal Canadiens, Edmonton Oilers, and New York Rangers. He played right wing/centre and shot right-handed.

Career 
Fraser was drafted in the 9th round, 193rd overall by the Montreal Canadiens in the 1991 NHL Entry Draft while in college playing for Dartmouth College. After being drafted Fraser returned to Dartmouth and played for another 3 years with the team, having his best year during the 1992–1993 season in which he scored 44 points in 26 games and earned ECAC conference second All-Star team honors. Fraser also made 2 appearances with the Canadian National team during the 1992–1993 and 1993–1994 seasons.

After college Fraser joined the Canadiens minor league affiliate, the Fredericton Canadiens. He played two seasons with the Canadiens, enjoying a solid season during the 1995–1996 campaign where he scored 74 points in 58 games. This play allowed Fraser to make his NHL debut with the Montreal Canadiens that year, appearing in 14 games and scoring 2 points. Fraser began the 1996–1997 season with the Fredericton Canadiens but was traded to the Calgary Flames early in the season. Fraser played the majority of the season with the Saint John Flames, scoring 32 points in 37 games.

The following season Fraser signed with the Edmonton Oilers. Once again he played the majority of year in the minors with the Hamilton Bulldogs, but his play allowed him to return to the NHL with the Oilers for part of the season. Fraser surprised many with his play once he returned to the NHL. He scored 23 points in 29 games and earned a full-time spot with the Oilers for the playoffs, appearing in 11 games and scoring 2 points.

Fraser signed as a free agent with the New York Rangers for the 1998–1999 season. He had a chance to crack the Rangers' starting lineup, but after a slow start, Fraser was sent to the Hartford Wolf Pack for the remainder of the season, scoring 37 points in 36 games with the club.

Following the 1998–1999 season Fraser retired from hockey. After retirement, he graduated from Babson College and earned his MBA.

Career statistics

International play

Awards and honors

External links
 
 Legends of Hockey Profile

1972 births
Living people
Canadian ice hockey right wingers
Carolina Monarchs players
Dartmouth Big Green men's ice hockey players
Edmonton Oilers players
Fredericton Canadiens players
Hamilton Bulldogs (AHL) players
Hartford Wolf Pack players
Sportspeople from Moncton
Montreal Canadiens draft picks
Montreal Canadiens players
New York Rangers players
Saint John Flames players
San Antonio Dragons players
Wheeling Thunderbirds players
Ice hockey people from New Brunswick